Contra errores Graecorum, ad Urbanum IV Pontificem Maximum (Against the Errors of the Greeks, to Pope Urban IV) is a short treatise (an "opusculum") written in 1263 by Roman Catholic theologian Saint Thomas Aquinas as a contribution to Pope Urban's efforts at reunion with the Eastern Church.  Aquinas wrote the treatise in 1263 while he was papal theologian and conventual lector in the Dominican studium at Orvieto after his first regency as professor of theology at the University of Paris which ended in 1259 and before he took up his duties in 1265 reforming the Dominican studium at Santa Sabina, the forerunner of the Pontifical University of Saint Thomas Aquinas, Angelicum, in Rome.

Text

The title of the treatise was not given by Aquinas himself, and it contains nothing that is directed against the doctrine of the Eastern Orthodox Church, but only, in the view of theologian Yves Congar, a defence of Catholic doctrine against Eastern misunderstandings.

The 72 chapters of the work are each of the length of a paragraph in a modern book. In it Aquinas presents the teaching of the Greek Church Fathers as in harmony with that of the Latin Church. The book is arranged in two parts, the first of 32 chapters and the second of 40, each part preceded by a prologue, and the work as a whole concluded with an epilogue. All the first part and 31 of the 40 chapters of the second concern pneumatology (doctrine on the Holy Spirit). Of the final 9 chapters, 7 deal with the position of the Roman Pontiff, and the last two with the use of leavened bread in the Eucharist and with purgatory. In all of these Aquinas quoted expressions by Fathers of the Greek Church in support of the teaching propounded by the Latin Church.

Aquinas died on his way to participate in the 1274 Second Council of Lyons, to which he had been invited, but this treatise, which he had written eleven years before and not for the use of this Council, was influential at the Council.

The 1968 Leonine edition is available in Latin at the Corpus Thomisticum website as well as in the Internet Archive.

A complete English translation is given at the website of the Dominican Province of St Joseph.

A different English translation, but only of the first ten chapters, is found at the website of Ecclesia Triumphans Catholic Apologetics.

Contents

The titles of the first ten chapters given in the latter translation indicate something of the contents of the short work:
 How it should be understood when it is said that the Son comes from the Father as an effect from a cause (Quomodo intelligitur hoc quod dicitur quod filius habet a patre sicut causatum a causa).
 How it should be understood when it is said that the Son is second, after the Father, and the Holy Spirit is third (Quomodo intelligitur cum dicitur, quod filius sit secundus a patre, et spiritus sanctus sit tertius).
 How it should be understood when it is said that the Holy Spirit is the third light (Quomodo intelligitur hoc quod spiritus sanctus sit tertium lumen).
 How it should be understood when it is said that essence is begotten in the Son, and spirated in the Holy Spirit (Quomodo intelligitur, quod essentia sit genita in filio, et spirata in spiritu sancto).
 How it should be understood when it is said that Jesus is the Son of the Father's essence (Quomodo intelligitur quod Iesus dicitur filius paternae essentiae).
 How it should be understood when it is said that what naturally belongs to the Father, naturally belongs to the Son (Quomodo intelligitur, quod quae sunt propria naturaliter patris, sunt propria filii).
 How it should be understood when it is said that the perfection of the Father does not lack anything from either the Son or the Holy Spirit (Quomodo intelligitur quod pater neque filio neque spiritu sancto indiget ad sui perfectionem).
 How it should be understood when the Holy Spirit is called unbegotten (Quomodo intelligitur quod spiritus sanctus dicatur ingenitus).
 How it should be understood when the Holy Spirit is said to be the middle between the Father and the Son (Quomodo intelligitur quod spiritus sanctus dicitur medius patris et filii).
 How it should be understood when it is said that the Holy Spirit is the image of the Son (Quomodo intelligitur hoc quod dicitur, quod spiritus sanctus sit imago filii).

In his treatise, Aquinas "demonstrated that there was a theological harmony between the Greek Church Fathers and the Latin Church". He pointed out that one source of misunderstandings between Greeks and Latins was the difficulty of finding appropriate words in each language` with which to translate technical theological terms used in the other:
Many things which sound well enough in Greek do not perhaps, sound well in Latin. Hence, Latins and Greeks professing the same faith do so using different words. For among the Greeks it is said, correctly, and in a Catholic way, that the Father, Son and Holy Spirit are three hypostases. But with the Latins it does not sound right to say that there are three substantiae, even though on a purely verbal basis the term hypostasis in Greek means the same as the term substantia in Latin. The fact is, substantia in Latin is more frequently used to signify essence. And both we and the Greeks hold that in God there is but one essence. So where the Greeks speak of three hypostases, we Latins speak of three personae, as Augustine in the seventh book on the Trinity also teaches. And, doubtless, there are many similar instances.
It is, therefore, the task of the good translator, when translating material dealing with the Catholic faith, to preserve the meaning, but to adapt the mode of expression so that it is in harmony with the idiom of the language into which he is translating. For obviously, when anything spoken in a literary fashion in Latin is explained in common parlance, the explanation will be inept if it is simply word for word. All the more so, when anything expressed in one language is translated merely word for word into another, it will be no surprise if perplexity concerning the meaning of the original sometimes occurs.

Problem of the sources

The apologetic impact of the work is limited, due to the fact that Thomas uses a collection of texts compiled by Nicholas of Crotone which contains doubtful attributions and personal glosses of the compiler that bent the text in direction of the Latin theology. According to Jean-Pierre Torell, "on four specific questions concerning the procession a filio, the primacy of the pope, the Eucharistic celebration with unleavened bread, and purgatory, Thomas is clearly forced to rely more on the texts that are closer to Latin theology, when these are in fact glosses foreign to the Fathers."

See also
Filioque
East-West Schism
 Eastern Orthodox – Roman Catholic theological differences
 Eastern Orthodox – Roman Catholic ecclesiastical differences

References

External links 
 

Medieval literature
Scholasticism
13th-century Latin books
13th-century Christian texts
East–West Schism
Trinitarianism
Catholic theology and doctrine
Works by Thomas Aquinas